The Frankokratia (sometimes anglicized as Francocracy,  "rule of the Franks"), also known as Latinokratia ("rule of the Latins") and, for the Venetian domains, Venetokratia or Enetokratia ("rule of the Venetians"), was the period in Greek history after the Fourth Crusade (1204), when a number of primarily French and Italian states were established by the Partitio terrarum imperii Romaniae on the territory of the dissolved Byzantine Empire.

The terms Frankokratia and Latinokratia derive from the name given by the Orthodox Greeks to the Western French and Italians who originated from territories that once belonged to the Frankish Empire, as this was the political entity that ruled much of the former Western Roman Empire after the collapse of Roman authority and power. The span of the Frankokratia period differs by region: the political situation proved highly volatile, as the Frankish states fragmented and changed hands, and the Greek successor states re-conquered many areas.

With the exception of the Ionian Islands and some islands or forts which remained in Venetian hands until the turn of the 19th century, the end of the Frankokratia in most Greek lands came with the Ottoman conquest, chiefly in the 14th to 17th centuries, which ushered in the period known as "Tourkokratia" ("rule of the Turks"; see Ottoman Greece).

Latin states

Latin Empire
The Latin Empire (1204–1261), centered in Constantinople and encompassing Thrace and Bithynia, was created as the successor of the Byzantine Empire after the Fourth Crusade, while also exercising nominal suzerainty over the other Crusader principalities. Its territories were gradually reduced to little more than the capital, which was eventually captured by the Empire of Nicaea in 1261.
 Duchy of Philippopolis (1204 – after 1230), fief of the Latin Empire in northern Thrace, until its capture by the Bulgarians.
 Lemnos formed a fief of the Latin Empire under the Venetian Navigajoso family from 1207 until conquered by the Byzantines in 1278. Its rulers bore the title of megadux ("grand duke") of the Latin Empire.
 The Kingdom of Thessalonica (1205–1224), encompassing Macedonia and Thessaly. The brief existence of the Kingdom was almost continuously troubled by warfare with the Second Bulgarian Empire; eventually, it was conquered by the Despotate of Epirus.
 The County of Salona (1205–1410), centred at Salona (modern Amfissa), like Bodonitsa, was formed as a vassal state of the Kingdom of Thessalonica, and later came under the influence of Achaea. It came under Catalan and later Navarrese rule in the 14th century, before being sold to the Knights Hospitaller in 1403. It was finally conquered by the Ottomans in 1410.
 The Marquisate of Bodonitsa (1204–1414), like Salona, was originally created as a vassal state of the Kingdom of Thessalonica, but later came under the influence of Achaea. In 1335, the Venetian Giorgi family took control, and ruled until the Ottoman conquest in 1414.
 The Principality of Achaea (1205–1432), encompassing the Morea or Peloponnese peninsula. It quickly emerged as the strongest state, and prospered even after the demise of the Latin Empire. Its main rival was the Byzantine Despotate of the Morea, which eventually succeeded in conquering the Principality. It also exercised suzerainty over the Lordship of Argos and Nauplia (1205–1388).
 The Duchy of Athens (1205–1458), with its two capitals Thebes and Athens, and encompassing Attica, Boeotia, and parts of southern Thessaly. In 1311, the Duchy was conquered by the Catalan Company, and in 1388, it passed into the hands of the Florentine Acciaiuoli family, which kept it until the Ottoman conquest in 1456.
 The Duchy of Naxos or of the Archipelago (1207–1579), founded by the Sanudo family, it encompassed most of the Cyclades. In 1383, it passed under the control of the Crispo family. The Duchy became an Ottoman vassal in 1537, and was finally annexed to the Ottoman Empire in 1579.
 The Triarchy of Negroponte (1205–1470), encompassing the island of Negroponte (Euboea), originally a vassal of Thessalonica, then of Achaea. It was fragmented into three baronies (terzi or "triarchies") run each by two barons (the sestieri). This fragmentation enabled Venice to gain influence acting as mediators. By 1390 Venice had established direct control of the entire island, which remained in Venetian hands until 1470, when it was captured by the Ottomans.

Minor Crusader principalities
 The County palatine of Cephalonia and Zakynthos (1185–1479). It encompassed the Ionian Islands of Cephalonia, Zakynthos, Ithaca, and, from around 1300, also Lefkas (Santa Maura). Created as a vassal to the Kingdom of Sicily, it was ruled by the Orsini family from 1195 to 1335, and after a short interlude of Anjou rule the county passed to the Tocco family in 1357. The county was split between Venice and the Ottomans in 1479.
 Rhodes became the headquarters of the military monastic order of the Knights Hospitaller of Saint John in 1310, and the Knights retained control of the island (and neighbouring islands of the Dodecanese island group) until ousted by the Ottomans in 1522.

Genoese colonies
Genoese attempts to occupy Corfu and Crete in the aftermath of the Fourth Crusade were thwarted by the Venetians. It was only during the 14th century, exploiting the terminal decline of the Byzantine Empire under the Palaiologos dynasty, and often in agreement with the weakened Byzantine rulers, that various Genoese nobles established domains in the northeastern Aegean:
 The Gattilusi family established a number of fiefs, under nominal Byzantine suzerainty, over the island of Lesbos (1355–1462) and later also the islands of Lemnos, Thasos (1414–1462) and Samothrace (1355–1457), as well as the Thracian town of Ainos (1376–1456).
 The Lordship of Chios with the port of Phocaea. In 1304–1330 under the Zaccaria family, and, after a Byzantine interlude, from 1346 and until the Ottoman conquest in 1566 under the Maona di Chio e di Focea company.

Venetian colonies
The Republic of Venice accumulated several possessions in Greece, which formed part of its Stato da Màr. Some of them survived until the fall of the Republic itself in 1797:
 Crete, also known as Candia, (1211–1669), one of the Republic's most important overseas possessions, despite frequent revolts by the Greek population, it was retained until captured by the Ottomans in the Cretan War.
 Corfu (1207–1214 and 1386–1797), was captured by Venice from its Genoese ruler shortly after the Fourth Crusade. The island was soon retaken by the Despotate of Epirus, but captured in 1258 by the Kingdom of Sicily. The island remained under Angevin rule until 1386, when Venice reimposed its control, which would last until the end of the Republic itself.
 Lefkas (1684–1797), originally part of the Palatine county and the Orsini-ruled Despotate of Epirus, it came under Ottoman rule in 1479, and was conquered by the Venetians in 1684, during the Morean War.
 Zakynthos (1479–1797), originally part of the Palatine county and the Orsini-ruled Despotate of Epirus, it fell to Venice in 1479
 Cephalonia and Ithaca (1500–1797), originally part of the Palatine county and the Orsini-ruled Despotate of Epirus, they came under Ottoman rule in 1479, and were conquered by the Venetians in December 1500.
 Tinos and Mykonos, bequeathed to Venice in 1390.
 various coastal fortresses in the Peloponnese and mainland Greece: 
 Modon (Methoni) and Coron (Koroni), occupied in 1207, confirmed by the Treaty of Sapienza, and held until taken by the Ottomans in August 1500.
 Nauplia (Italian Napoli di Romania), acquired through the purchase of the lordship of Argos and Nauplia in 1388, held until captured by the Ottomans in 1540.
 Argos, acquired through the purchase of the lordship of Argos and Nauplia but seized by the Despotate of the Morea and not handed over to Venice until June 1394, held until captured by the Ottomans in 1462.
 Athens, acquired in 1394 from the heirs of Nerio I Acciaioli, but lost to the latter's bastard son Antonio in 1402–03, a fact recognized by the Republic in a treaty in 1405.
 Parga, port town on the coast of Epirus, acquired in 1401. It was governed as a dependency of Corfu, and remained so even after the end of the Venetian Republic in 1797, finally being ceded by the British to Ali Pasha in 1819.
 Lepanto (Naupaktos), port in Aetolia, briefly seized by a Venetian captain in 1390, in 1394 its inhabitants offered to hand it over to Venice, but were rebuffed. Finally sold to Venice in 1407 by its Albanian ruler, Paul Spata, lost to the Ottomans in 1540.
 Patras, held in 1408–13 and 1417–19 in lease, for 1,000 ducats per year, from the Latin Archbishop of Patras, who thus hoped to thwart a Turkish or Byzantine takeover of the city.
 The Northern Sporades (Skiathos, Skopelos, and Alonissos), were Byzantine possessions that came under Venetian rule after the Fall of Constantinople in 1453. They were captured by the Ottomans under Hayreddin Barbarossa in 1538.
 Monemvasia (Malvasia), a Byzantine outpost left unconquered by the Ottomans in 1460, it accepted Venetian rule, until captured by the Ottomans in 1540.
 Vonitsa on the coast of Epirus, captured in 1684 and held as a mainland exclave of the Ionian Islands until the end of the Republic.
 Preveza on the coast of Epirus, occupied during the Morean War (1684–99), recaptured in 1717 and held as a mainland exclave of the Ionian Islands until the end of the Republic.
 The whole of the Peloponnese or Morea peninsula was conquered during the Morean War in the 1680s and became a colony as the "Kingdom of the Morea", but it was lost again to the Ottomans in 1715.

Gallery

Venetian possessions (till 1797):

See also
 Latin Church in the Middle East
 Timeline of Orthodoxy in Greece (1204–1453)
 Kingdom of Cyprus

References

Sources

External links
 The Latin Occupation in the Greek Lands, from the Foundation of the Hellenic World